This list of leading goalscorers for the France national football team contains football players who have played for the France national football team and is listed according to their number of goals scored. The France national football team represents the nation of France in international football. It is fielded by the French Football Federation and competes as a member of UEFA. 

As hundreds of players have played for the team since it started officially registering its players in 1904, only players with 10 or more official goals are included. The national team's record goal-scorer is Olivier Giroud with 53 goals, followed by Thierry Henry with 51 goals and Antoine Griezmann, who has scored 42 goals.

 Goals and appearances are composed of FIFA World Cup and UEFA European Championship matches and each competition's required qualification matches, as well as UEFA Nations League matches, FIFA Confederations Cup matches and numerous international friendly tournaments and matches.

Statistics correct as of game against Argentina on 18 December 2022

See also
 List of France international footballers

References

External links
 FFF Player Database

goal

de:Französische Fußballnationalmannschaft#Erfolgreichste Torschützen
it:Classifica dei marcatori della nazionale di calcio francese

de:Liste der französischen Fußballnationalspieler
fr:Liste des footballeurs internationaux français
Association football player non-biographical articles
France national football team records and statistics